Rapid transit in Brazil consists of seven metro systems, one hybrid metro-suburban system, and several tram/light rail systems.

Rapid transit systems

Operational

Proposed

Hybrid metro/suburban systems

References